John McNeill may refer to:

Sir John McNeill (diplomat) (1795–1883), Scottish surgeon and diplomat
John McNeill (Australian politician) (1868–1943), Australian politician
John McNeill (Alberta politician), municipal politician from Calgary, Alberta, Canada
John McNeill (New South Wales politician) (1872–1916), New South Wales state politician
John McNeill (Ontario politician) (1848–1924), Ontario farmer and political figure
John McNeill (lawyer) (1899–?), lawyer and judge
John McNeill (footballer) (1910–2002), Maltese footballer who played for Hull City and Bury
John McNeill (botanist) (born 1933), British and Canadian botanist and museum director
J. R. McNeill (John Robert McNeill, born 1954), American environmental historian
John McNeill (speedway rider) (born 1955), Australian speedway rider
John McNeill (actor) (born 1956), Australian actor and teacher
Sir John McNeill (British Army officer) (1831–1904), Scottish recipient of the Victoria Cross
John Hanson McNeill (1815–1864), Confederate officer during the American Civil War
John J. McNeill (1925–2015), priest, former Jesuit, psychotherapist and academic theologian
John S. McNeill (1829–1924), merchant and political figure in Nova Scotia, Canada
John T. McNeill (1885–1975), Canadian theological historian

See also
John McNeil (disambiguation)
John MacNeill (disambiguation)
Ian Niall (1916–2002), pen name of Scottish writer John McNeillie